Of Greed and Ants is a drama series produced by Hong Kong's Television Broadcasts Limited that is based on the history and scandal surrounding the Carrian Group and its founder, George Tan. The drama also makes numerous references to the 1980s.

The series aired in January 2020, and concluded its run on 14 February that same year.

Plot
The series began in Hong Kong during the 1970s, an era in which Hong Kong's economy experienced rapid growth. Thai Chinese Gordon Wing Muk-Tong changed his view on life and left for Hong Kong after his father suffered a tragic fate at the hands of gangsters in Thailand. After witnessing the power of the stock market, he plotted to become a stock manipulator so as to control the stock market. The lives of two young men would be affected by him as he slowly rises to power.

Reception
It was given a rating of 7.1/10 on Douban and received 2 billion views in China. The way the story is unfolded is similar to the commercially successful 1992 TVB drama The Greed Of Man whereby flashbacks were used.

References

2020 in Hong Kong television
TVB dramas